Wolfgang Ganter (born June 22, 1978 in Stuttgart) is a German photographer and visual artist based in Berlin. He uses bacterial cultures, chemical process, dyes and time to transform the photos of renown artworks, which are then fixed and photographed in detail. His work is also included in permanent collections such as the Museum der Moderne Salzburg, Kunsthalle Mannheim, Futurium, Karolinska Institute and the Städtische Museen Heilbronn.

Exhibitions (selection)

Solo exhibitions 
2022
 Experimentum, Kunsthalle Brennabor, Brandenburg an der Havel, Germany
 Stoffwechsel, Kunstverein Schwäbisch Hall, Schwäbisch Hall, Germany

2019
 Tiny Supernova, Kunsthalle Mannheim, Mannheim, Germany
 Prima Materia, Kunstverein Kunsthaus Potsdam, Potsdam
 Parvus Miraculum, Olsson Gallery, Stockholm
 Afterglow, Burster Gallery, Berlin

2018
 Chef d’Euvre Brisé, Ambacher Contemporary, München
 Parvus Miraculum, Burster Gallery, Karlsruhe

2017
 Chef d’Euvre Brisé, Ambacher Contemporary, Paris
 Wolfgang Ganter, Rockefeller University, New York City
 Wolfgang Ganter, Gallery of the College of Staten Island, New York City

2016
 Regeneratio, Berlin Hyp, Berlin

2015
 Casus Coactus, Burster Gallery, Berlin

2014
 Bactereality, Städtische Galerie, Tuttlingen
 Afterglow, Reiter Gallery, Leipzig
 Six Masterpieces, Olsson Gallery, Stockholm

2013
 Decompositione, Kunststiftung Baden-Württemberg
 Misremember, Rathaus Stuttgart
  TransPORT, Westwerk, Hamburg

2012
 Misremember, Kunststiftung Baden-Württemberg
 Informell Logic, Eli Ridgway Gallery, San Francisco
 Bakterialiät, Olsson Gallery, Stockholm

2012
 Inside, Inside, Cultuurwerf, Vlissingen

2009
  Accidentanalysis, Maud Piquion Gallery, Berlin

2008
 Seasick, Baer Ridgway Exhibitions, San Francisco

2006
 Shake Hands, Förderkreis Kunst und Kultur Offenburg

2005
 2005: Der Tod ist kein Beinbruch, Karl Heinz Meyer Gallery, Karlsruhe

References

External links 
 Official website

Living people
1978 births
Artists from Stuttgart
Photographers from Berlin
20th-century German photographers
21st-century German photographers